is a hack and slash video game and the seventh official installment of the Dynasty Warriors series. It is developed by Omega Force and published by Tecmo Koei. The story is based on the 14th-century Chinese historical novel Romance of the Three Kingdoms. The game was unveiled at the 2010 Tokyo Game Show. On 26 October, it was revealed at the Koei Press Conference to have improved graphics and gameplay, with the support of stereoscopic 3D. Tecmo Koei released it in North American on 29 March 2011, in Europe on 8 April 2011 and in Australia on 14 April 2011, after news that it has been delayed and was released on both the PlayStation 3 and Xbox 360. Tecmo Koei Japan had released Dynasty Warriors 7 with Xtreme Legends, along with downloadable content up to October 2011 released on PlayStation 3 version, on Microsoft Windows. It was later released worldwide in December 2018 via Steam.

Gameplay
Dynasty Warriors 7 is the first game in the series to extend past the Battle of Wuzhang Plains. Consequently, the Jin Kingdom was added, bringing the total number of major factions to four.

This game's Musou mode is not character based but kingdom based.
The Renbu combat system has been removed, replaced by the return to the familiar charge system, which allows players to end increasingly longer combos with a charge attack of varying effect depending on the current situation. Characters are also allowed to wield more than one weapon during battle, with the ability to execute a special attack upon switching. In addition, both aerial musou attacks (depending on the character) and certain aerial combos have been introduced. Players will still be able to adjust the camera angle.
Character and weapon level development/customisation can now be done during battle. Players can also choose to switch their equipped weapons during battle and can obtain new weapons by defeating officers.
Characters have a special attack with a weapon indicated with an EX icon. The EX attack uses a sequence of attacks and/or charge attacks, and the result will vary with most characters. Characters also have 2 musou attacks that they perform using their Ex Weapon which can consist of grapples, midair, charges, quick/heavy strikes or a combo of hits performed in certain ways.
An additional mode known as Conquest Mode (Chronicle Mode for the Japanese version) has been incorporated into the game. Gameplay features include a player-forged path through China in which the player can also choose to play "Other" characters in the kingdom, due to the fact that they have not been given their own story in Story Mode. Conquest Mode will also feature both online and offline co-operative play. This mode also replaces the old Free Mode present in previous titles.
The morale bar has been removed from the visual interface; however, the morale system itself still remains and will be reflected from the messages of officers and their respective facial expressions (neutral, happy, sad, angry etc.) when said message appears.
Some of the major battles are split into two parts, so the player can have a different perspectives of the battle. One example would be in Shu's Changban stage — the first part concentrating on Zhao Yun and the second part on Zhang Fei.
Swimming and climbing ladders from the previous Dynasty Warriors 6 are once again present.
 The Weapon system has been changed dramatically from previous titles and players can now choose up to 10 or 11 weapons from each weapon category, unique Weapons are once again available after being cut from Dynasty Warriors 6
Support animals which aid players in battle are included in this installment — some will follow and battle with the player; some can be ridden. Available animals are horses, bears, pandas, elephants, wolves, tigers and falcons.
Downloadable Content will be available. Content will include stages, music and costumes from previous games and some original costumes plus new weapons and the option to use the original Japanese Voices.

Characters
* Denotes new characters to the series
** Denotes characters added in Dynasty Warriors 7: Xtreme Legends
*** Denotes characters added in Dynasty Warriors 7: Empires
Bold denotes default characters

Note 1: This is Cai Wenji's first appearance in a European or North American Dynasty Warriors game. She is, however, a playable character in Shin Sangoku Musou: Multi Raid 2, currently only available in Japan.

Note 2: Zuo Ci did not return due to a lack of story for him.

Note 3: Guo Jia, Pang De and Wang Yi were added in Dynasty Warriors 7: Xtreme Legends.

Note 4: Xu Shu was added in Dynasty Warriors 7: Empires.

Story Mode

Shu

1 Yuan Shao becomes enemy after Zhao Yun discovers Guan Yu.
2 Another Ally Commander in Part 1 is Zhang Fei, and in Part 2 is Zhao Yun.
3 Another Ally Commander in Part 1 is Liu Qi, and in Part 2 is Zhuge Liang.
4 Ally Commander in Part 1 is Liu Shan, and in Part 2 are Liu Shan and Guan Yu.
5 Another Ally Commander in Part 1 is Ma Su, and in Part 2 is Zhao Yun.

Wei

1 Another Ally Commander in Part 1 is Dian Wei, and in Part 2 is Yue Jin.
2 Another Ally Commander in Part 1 are Cao Hong and Xiahou Dun, and in Part 2 are Cao Zhang and Xun Yu.
3 Must defeat Guan Yu even if Liu Bei has withdraws.
4 Another Ally Commander in Part 1 is Cao Zhang, and another Enemy Commander in Part 1 is Sun Quan.
5 Another Ally Commander in Part 1 is Li Dian, and in Part 2 is Xue Ti. Then must defeat Taishi Ci even if Sun Quan has withdraws.
6 Another Ally Commander in Part 1 is Zhang He, and in Part 2 is Cao Zhi.
7 Another Ally Commander in Part 1 is Lu Chang, and in Part 2 is Cao Ren.

Wu

1 Another Ally Commander in Part 1 is Sun Ce, and in Part 2 are Sun Shangxiang and Zhou Yu.
2 Another Ally Commander in Part 1 are Song Qian and Zhuge Liang.
3 Another Ally Commander in Part 1 is Ling Tong, and in Part 2 is Gan Ning.
4 Another Ally Commander in Part 2 is Lu Xun.
5 Another Ally Commander in Part 1 is Sun Deng, and in Part 2 is Song Qian.

Jin

1 Another Ally Commander in Part 2 is Zhuge Dan.
2 Another Ally Commander in Part 1 are Sima Wang and Wang Yuanji, and in Part 2 is Wang Yuanji.
3 Another Ally Commander in Part 2 is Zhuge Dan.
4 Another Ally Commander in Part 1 is Deng Ai, and in Part 2 is Zhong Hui.
5 Another Ally Commander in Part 1 is Wang Yuanji, and in Part 2 are Wen Yang and Wen Hu.
6 Another Ally Commander in Part 1 is Wen Hu, in Part 2 is Sima Wang, and in Part 3 is Jia Chong.
7 Must defeat Jiang Wei even if Liu Shan withdraws.

Reception

Dynasty Warriors 7 received "mixed or average" reviews upon release, according to video game review aggregator  Metacritic.

Colin Moriarty from IGN titled his review "Repetitive adventure is repetitive" and said Dynasty Warriors 7 is "simply too much of the same thing over and over again to have any sort of broad appeal". He scored the game 5/10.

Famitsu magazine was quite less critical, and awarded the game a total of 36/40, composed of a 9/9/9/9 score and was considered a great improvement over previous titles. In the first week of its release it sold 253,900 copies.

Destructoid awarded the game 8/10 in a generally positive review, noting the only disappointments being the low variation in move sets, and the lack of Free Mode. The Gamer's Hub rated the game 4/5, commending the improved graphics, the new conquest mode, and the better flowing story.

Related games

In late May 2011, Tecmo Koei announced that the game would be ported to the PlayStation Portable under the name Shin Sangokumusou 6 Special. It was released on August 25, 2012. During E3, Koei announced that the game will not be sold overseas, but that a new Dynasty Warriors game called Dynasty Warriors Next was in development for PS Vita and will be sold overseas instead.

On the 29th of June, Famitsu Magazine released information about the new Dynasty Warriors 7 Xtreme Legends. The game features 3 new characters, only for Wei: Guo Jia (who won a poll conducted by Famitsu), Wang Yi, and Pang De (who returns to the flagship title for the first time since Dynasty Warriors 5). The game features the ability to port saved data from Dynasty Warriors 7, and the MIX-JOY system allows new modes and weapons from Xtreme Legends to be combined with those from Dynasty Warriors 7. Free Mode returns, along with a co-op Story Mode, both of which were absent in Dynasty Warriors 7. Two more modes, Challenge Mode and Legend Mode, are added. It was released on September 29, 2011 in Japan, November 15, 2011 in United States, and November 18, 2011 in Europe as a PlayStation 3 exclusive title. Thus far, there have been no plans to release the game on other platforms. However, since the announcement of Dynasty Warriors 7 with Xtreme Legends on Microsoft Windows platform,  Xtreme Legends may no longer be considered a PlayStation 3 exclusive title.

The Dynasty Warriors characters who appear in the crossover game Warriors Orochi 3 use the character models from this game. However, their dual-weapon ability is removed and characters are fixed to wield certain weapon types.

In May 2012, the Empires expansion for the game was announced to be released on PlayStation 3 on November 8, 2012 in Japan. As with other Empires expansion, the game is more focused on political and tactical battle system. It includes a new character named Xu Shu. The game was also released in North America and Europe on February 26 and 22, 2013 respectively, though the game only translates the texts while still using the original Japanese dubs. Like Warriors Orochi 3, the game will only be available through digital download in North America, while other regions will have it as retail.

See also
 Dynasty Warriors
 Romance of the Three Kingdoms
 Koei
 Warriors Orochi
 Samurai Warriors

References

External links
 Official website of North America
 Official website of United Kingdom

2011 video games
Dynasty Warriors
Koei games
PlayStation 3 games
PlayStation Portable games
Windows games
Xbox 360 games
Crowd-combat fighting games
Video games developed in Japan
Video games set in China
Video games based on Chinese mythology
Multiplayer and single-player video games